The 2006–07 Bundesliga was the 44th season of the Bundesliga, Germany's premier football league. It began on 11 August 2006 and ended on 19 May 2007. Bayern Munich were the defending champions.

Team changes from 2005–06
Three teams from the 2. Bundesliga were promoted at the end of previous season: 
 VfL Bochum (champions)
 Alemannia Aachen (runners-up)
 Energie Cottbus

The three teams relegated were:
 1. FC Kaiserslautern
 1. FC Köln
 MSV Duisburg

Season overview 
VfB Stuttgart began the campaign with the youngest squad of the Bundesliga and were widely seen as a competitor for an UEFA Cup berth. They began their season with a 0–3 home defeat against 1. FC Nürnberg and even dropped in reach of the relegation zone after another home defeat against Borussia Dortmund during the third round.

During the rest of the season the team managed to stabilize in the upper third of the table, eventually winning the last eight games of the season while competitors Schalke 04, Werder Bremen and Bayern Munich struggled. Stuttgart went on to claim their third championship in the Bundesliga and fifth German championship overall with a 2–1 home victory against Energie Cottbus during the last round of the season.

One week after winning the league championship, Stuttgart failed to win the Double after losing the 2007 DFB-Pokal Final against Nürnberg with a score of 2–3.

Manager Armin Veh who claimed his first championship as a Bundesliga coach was elected German Football Manager of the Year, while striker Mario Gómez was named Footballer of the Year (Germany) in 2007.

Team overview

Managerial changes

League table

Results

Overall
Most wins – VfB Stuttgart and Schalke 04 (21)
Fewest wins – Borussia Mönchengladbach (6)
Most draws – 1. FC Nürnberg and Hamburger SV (15)
Fewest draws – Schalke 04 (5)
Most losses – Borussia Mönchengladbach (20)
Fewest losses – VfB Stuttgart (6)
Most goals scored – Werder Bremen (76)
Fewest goals scored – Borussia Mönchengladbach (23)
Most goals conceded – Alemannia Aachen (70)
Fewest goals conceded – Werder Bremen and 1. FC Nürnberg (32)

Statistics

Top goalscorers

Champion squad

References

External links

 Official site of the DFB 
 Kicker.de 
 Official site of the Bundesliga 
 Official site of the Bundesliga

Bundesliga seasons
1
Germany